Dutty is a given name. Notable people with the name include:
 Dutty Boukman (died 1791), early Haitian Revolution leader
  (born 1996), Norwegian hip hop artist

See also
 Ditty
 Dutty Rock
 "Dutty Wine"
 "Dutty Love"